Harold Roitenberg (January 7, 1927 – December 20, 2018) was an American businessman who founded the catalog merchandiser and showroom Modern Merchandising Inc.

Biography
Roitenberg was born to a Jewish family, the son of Sarah and Norman Roitenberg. Roitenberg graduated with a B.A. in Journalism from the University of Minnesota. 
After school, he worked in the advertising department of Northwestern Auto Parts in Minneapolis and then went to work for his father-in-law who owned Minnesota Wholesalers which sold horse supplies. During his tenure, he expanded the company into a catalog showroom business that also sold small appliances, housewares, electronics, and jewelry.

Upon his father-in-law's death, Roitenberg was unable to obtain a satisfactory equity interest in the company and ventured out on his own founding Creative Merchandising & Publishing in 1960. As he had little in the way of resources, he could not support his own showroom so he instead developed a new business model which focused on producing catalogs for small businesses who wanted to develop a catalog presence but did not have the expertise, resources, and buying power to secure lower prices from manufacturers. Roitenberg's company allowed them to purchase collectively and secure lower prices. In 1961, he changed the name to Modern Merchandising Inc. Due to its origin as a catalog publisher, Modern Merchandising published its own catalog along with that of competitors Service Merchandise (founded by Harry Zimmerman) and Best Products (founded by Sydney Lewis); the three companies (whose owners were friends) had regional non-compete agreements with each other. In 1982, Modern Merchandising, then the 3rd largest catalog retailer, was acquired by Best Products in a stock transaction worth $109 million. The merger was accretive as Best Products' showrooms were mainly on the East Coast, Texas, and California while Modern Merchandising was mostly in the Midwest and Northwest.

Personal life
Roitenberg had five children: Steven Roitenberg, David Roitenberg, Sam Roitenberg, Jane Roitenberg Nolen, and Ursula Roitenber Galanos. All his sons predeceased him. Roitenberg was a victim of Bernard Madoff.

References

1927 births
2018 deaths
20th-century American Jews
20th-century American businesspeople
American company founders
University of Minnesota School of Journalism and Mass Communication alumni
20th-century American philanthropists
21st-century American Jews